The 2012 AFC U-19 Championship is the 37th edition of the tournament organized by the Asian Football Confederation. The AFC approved UAE as hosts of the 2012 AFC U-19 Championship on 23 November 2011. The top four teams will qualify directly to the 2013 FIFA U-20 World Cup hosted by Turkey.

Hosts
The Organising Committee announced that Bangladesh, Iran, Palestine, United Arab Emirates, Uzbekistan had expressed an interest to host the finals.

The decision of the Committee, the member associations should qualify for the finals to be eligible to host the competition. The decision on the hosts was taken in the committee’s next meeting on 23 November 2011 based on the results of the qualifiers.

Venues

Qualification

The qualification draw was held on 30 March 2011.

Qualifiers

Draw
The draw for the Final tournament was held on 13 May 2012 in Dubai, United Arab Emirates.

Squads

Group stage
All times are UTC+04:00.

Group A

Group B

Group C

Group D

Knockout stage

Knockout map

Quarter-finals
Winners qualified for 2013 FIFA U-20 World Cup.

Semi-finals

Final

Winners

Goalscorers

Awards
 Top scorer:  Igor Sergeev
 MVP:  Mohannad Abdul-Raheem
 Best Goalkeeper:  Mohammed Hameed
 Fair play team:

Countries to participate in 2013 FIFA U-20 World Cup
Top 4 teams qualified for 2013 FIFA U-20 World Cup.

References

External links
  

 

 
AFC U-19 Championship
Afc U-19 Championship
International association football competitions hosted by the United Arab Emirates
Afc U-19 Championship
2012 in youth association football